Gremlin is an inhibitor in the TGF beta signaling pathway. It primarily inhibits bone morphogenesis and is implicated in disorders of increased bone formation and several cancers.

Structure 

Gremlin1, previously known as Drm, is a highly conserved 20.7-kDa, 184 amino acid glycoprotein part of the DAN family and is a cysteine knot-secreted protein. Gremlin1 was first identified in differential screening as a transcriptional down-regulated gene in v-mos-transformed rat embryonic fibroblasts.

Function 

Gremlin1 (Grem1) is known for its antagonistic interaction with bone morphogenetic proteins (BMPs) in the TGF beta signaling pathway. Grem1 inhibits predominantly BMP2 and BMP4 in limb buds and functions as part of a self-regulatory feedback signaling system, which is essential for normal limb bud development and digit formation. Inhibition of BMPs by Grem1 in limb buds allows the transcriptional up-regulation of the fibroblast growth factors (FGFs) 4 and 8 and sonic hedgehog (SHH) ligands, which are part of the signaling system that controls progression of limb bud development. Grem1 regulation of BMP4 in mice embryos is also essential for kidney and lung branching morphogenesis.

Clinical significance

Cancer 
Data from microarrays of cancer and non-cancer tissues suggest that grem1 and other BMP antagonists are important in the survival of cancer stroma and proliferation in some cancers. Grem1 expression is found in many cancers and is thought to play important roles in uterine cervix, lung, ovary, kidney, breast, colon, pancreas, and sarcoma carcinomas. More specifically, the Grem1 binding site (between residues 1 to 67) interacts with the binding protein YWHAH, (whose binding site for Grem1 is between residues 61-80) and is seen as a potential therapeutic and diagnostic target against human cancers.

Grem1 also plays a BMP-dependent role in angiogenesis on endothelium of human lung tissue, which implies a role for Grem1 in the development of cancer.

Bone 
Deletion of Grem1 in mice after birth increased bone formation and increased trabecular bone volume, whereas overexpression causes inhibition of bone formation and osteopenia. Conditional deletion of one copy of Grem1 does not produce an abnormal phenotype and deletion of both copies causes only a small difference in phenotype in one-month-old male mice, but this difference cannot be observed after 3 months of age.

Grem1 plays an important role in bone development and a lesser known function later in adulthood. Overexpression of Grem1 decreases osteoblast differentiation or the inhibition of bone formation and the ability for bone remodeling. In addition, overexpression of Grem1 in the mouse limb bud inhibits BMP signaling which can lead to digit loss as well as polydactyly. Overexpression of grem1 in stromal and osteoblastic cells in addition to the inhibition of BMP, grem 1 inhibits activation of Wnt/β-catenin signaling activity. The interaction between Grem1 and the Wnt signaling pathway is not fully understood.

Transcriptional regulation 
Cis-regulatory modules (CRMs) regulate when and where Grem1 is transcribed. It has been reported that a CRM acts as both a silencer and activator for Grem1 transcription in the mouse limb bud. There are additional CRMs that regulate Grem1 transcription.

References

External links